Constance McKee is the founder, president and CEO of Asilomar Pharmaceuticals. She is the co-inventor of one of the technologies upon which Asilomar's products are based. She is the former CEO of SynGenix Limited of Cambridge, UK. From 1990 to 1994, she was CEO of Cambridge Quantum Fund I, a seed venture fund at University of Cambridge.

McKee is an honors graduate of Stanford University and holds an MBA from Yale School of Management. She was also the recipient of a Bosch Fellowship in Germany.

References
Constance McKee bio at Asilomar

Yale School of Management alumni
Stanford University alumni
American women chief executives
Living people
American chief executives of financial services companies
American technology chief executives
Year of birth missing (living people)
21st-century American women